Rappaz R. N. Dainja is the first track and a single from KRS-One's 1995 self-titled album. It contains production from DJ Premier that samples "Come On, Come Over" by Jaco Pastorius, "Toys" by Herbie Hancock and "Telephone Girl" by Assagai. It contains an intro in which various hip hop artists such as MC Shan, Grand Wizard Theodore and Kool DJ Herc say positive things about KRS-One. KRS-One then starts rhyming three verses of braggadocios lyrics, each ended with a vocal sample from "Time's Up" by O.C. A music video directed by Brian "Black" Luvar was made for it, but it still did not reach any Billboard charts.

Lyrics from "Rappaz R. N. Dainja" were sampled in "Skills" by Gang Starr.

Track list
A-side
 Rappaz R. N. Dainja (LP version) (5:58)
 Rappaz R. N. Dainja (Kenny Parker mix) (4:04)

B-side
 Ah – Yeah (Mellow Vibe mix) (4:35)
 Sound of Da Police (LP version) (4:18)

Samples

References

1995 singles
KRS-One songs
Song recordings produced by DJ Premier
1995 songs
Songs written by KRS-One
Jive Records singles